Sheikh Emad Effat (15 August 1959 – 16 December 2011) was a senior Egyptian Sunni Islamic cleric at al-Azhar Mosque who was shot and killed during protest demonstrations on 16 December 2011. Effat had participated in the Arab Spring demonstrations in Egypt since the January uprising.

Background
Effat was born in Giza Governorate in Egypt to Ahmed Effat, a calligrapher. He was one of four children. Effat graduated from Arabic Language from the Faculty of Arts at Ain Shams University in 1991 with a BA with honors. In the late 1990s, he also obtained a Bachelor of Sharia (Islamic Law) and a Diploma in Islamic Jurisprudence from the Faculty of Sharia and Law at Al-Azhar University.  He is survived by his wife, Nashwa Abdel Tawwab, a journalist at Al-Ahram Weekly newspaper.

The Al-Azhar Sheikh was the director of fatwas, religious edicts, at Dar Al-Iftaa since 2003. He also worked as a Sharia researcher at the House of Authentication of Religious Studies and a researcher at MSX International Programming Company.

According to his widow, he had been participating in popular demonstrations since Egypt’s January uprising. “During sit-ins at Tahrir Square, he would go to work in the morning and spend the night in the square.  He wasn’t able to join the Cabinet sit-in, but when he saw [the violence], he couldn’t just stand and watch people dying, so he went down to the protest.”

Death
According to Yasmine El Rashidi of the New York Review of Books, quoting "a close associate of Ali Gomaa, the Mufti of Al-Azhar, “He was definitely targeted. Although the bullets weren’t fired by a soldier, the army is clearly complicit, letting it happen.” According to this theory, the government was trying to use the death of a popular Sheikh to stir anger towards the protest movement. However at a funeral march 17 December thousands of mourners chanted “Down with military rule.”  In an obituary, Al-masry Al-youm stated that he had been killed "by military police with a gunshot to his heart."

References

1959 births
Ain Shams University alumni
Al-Azhar University alumni
Egyptian imams
Egyptian Sunni Muslims
21st-century imams
Egyptian revolution
2011 deaths